Display (1923–1944) was an American Thoroughbred racehorse.

Background
He was owned and bred by Walter J. Salmon Sr., at his Mereworth Farm near Lexington, Kentucky. Display was sired by U.S. Racing Hall of Fame inductee Fair Play, a descendant of West Australian, the first winner of the English Triple Crown. He was out of the mare Cicuta.

Trained by Thomas J. Healey, Display was an extremely difficult horse to handle and in virtually every race caused considerable problems at the starting gate. Nonetheless, he was successful on the racetrack and was always a sound horse that made more than 100 starts in five years of racing.

Racing career
As a two-year-old, Display was entered in two major races for his age group, but neither was a winning effort. He was a runner-up to the J. K. L. Ross colt Penstick in the 1925 Grey Stakes at Old Woodbine Race Course in Toronto, Ontario, and had a third-place effort in the Pimlico Futurity at Pimlico Race Course in Baltimore, Maryland, behind winner Canter and runner-up Bubbling Over. The following spring, he met those two horses again in the 1926 Kentucky Derby. In the 13-horse field, Bubbling Over won the Derby with Canter eighth and Display, ridden by John Maiben, far back in 10th place. However, Display came back to win the Preakness Stakes. He went on that year to win the Latonia Championship Stakes and to earn a second-place finish in the American Derby and a third in the Travers Stakes, as well as the Washington Handicap.

Sent back to racing at age four, Display had his most successful season in 1927. He won the Jockey Club Cup Handicap, Toronto Cup Handicap, Baltimore Handicap, and the Champlain and Washington Handicaps. In addition, he earned seconds in the Jockey Club Gold Cup and the Toronto Autumn Cup, plus a third in the Bowie and Brooklyn Handicaps.

In 1928, Display won the Toronto Autumn Cup, and in Chicago, the Hawthorne Gold Cup Handicap. Attempting to win his second straight Washington Handicap at Laurel Park Racecourse, Display  ran second to Mike Hall, who went on to earn 1928 American Champion Older Male Horse honors.

Racing at age six in 1929, Display was third three times in important races: the King Edward Gold Cup, the Washington Handicap, and the Whitney Handicap.

Stud record
Retired to stud duty at his owner's Mereworth Farm, Display was a successful sire who passed along his durability to many of his offspring. Of his progeny, the most successful was Discovery, the 1935 American Horse of the Year and a U.S. Racing Hall of Fame inductee. Display died in 1944 at Mereworth Farm and is buried there. His last three foals were born that year.

Breeding

References

	

1923 racehorse births
1944 racehorse deaths
Racehorses bred in Kentucky
Racehorses trained in the United States
Preakness Stakes winners
Thoroughbred family 2-u
Godolphin Arabian sire line